Hosakote  is a village in the southern state of Karnataka, India. It is located in the Kushalanagar taluk of Kodagu district in Karnataka.

See also
 Kodagu
 Districts of Karnataka
 Mangalore

References

External links
 http://Kodagu.nic.in/

Villages in Kodagu district